Stacey Stewart North (born 25 November 1964 in Luton) is an English former professional footballer best known as a player for West Bromwich Albion.

Career
North joined his home town club Luton Town from school, but due to the solid defensive line-up at the club he was unable to break into the first team. Despite his own strengths, North only made 25 league appearances in four years before moving to West Bromwich Albion for £100,000 – a controversial transfer given that North had spent a short loan spell at Wolverhampton Wanderers only two years before.

Following 98 appearances in three years at the Hawthorns, North moved to Fulham for £130,000. Osteoarthritis forced an early retirement after only a year at Craven Cottage, and North moved to the US and became a coach.

References

1964 births
Living people
Footballers from Luton
English Football League players
English footballers
Luton Town F.C. players
Wolverhampton Wanderers F.C. players
West Bromwich Albion F.C. players
Fulham F.C. players
Association football defenders